The one hundred thousand rial banknote is a denomination of Iranian currency that was issued in 2010, replacing the 50,000 rial note as the largest denomination.

The bill features Rouhollah Khomeini's portrait on the front and the Tomb of Saadi on the back.

References

 
 

Banknotes of Iran
Currencies introduced in 2010
One-hundred-thousand-base-unit banknotes